Schwammel may refer to:

Ade Schwammel (1908–1979), an American football player
schwammeL, a mild profanity in the Kalix language

See also
Schwammerl (disambiguation)